Oleg Ponomarev (born 30 May 1992) is a Russian Paralympic Nordic skier who competed in cross-country skiing and biathlon at the 2014 Winter Paralympics, in Sochi. He won a bronze medal in the 1 km sprint for visually impaired athletes.

He won the bronze medal in the men's 10km visually impaired biathlon event at the 2021 World Para Snow Sports Championships held in Lillehammer, Norway. He also won the gold medal in the men's long-distance visually impaired cross-country skiing event.

References

External links
 

Paralympic biathletes of Russia
Living people
1992 births
Paralympic bronze medalists for Russia
Cross-country skiers at the 2014 Winter Paralympics
Medalists at the 2014 Winter Paralympics
Biathletes at the 2014 Winter Paralympics
Russian male cross-country skiers
Russian male biathletes
Paralympic medalists in cross-country skiing
21st-century Russian people